Lichenoconium pyxidatae is a species of lichenicolous fungus belonging to the class Dothideomycetes. It has a Holarctic distribution being found in Alaska and various parts of Russia, including Siberia, Franz Josef Land, Novaya Zemlya and Wrangel Island.

Host species
Lichenoconium pyxidatae is known to infect numerous host species. It has a preference to growing on the podium of Cladonia lichens. Known host species include:

 Cladonia chlorophaea (sensu lato)
 Cladonia coniocraea
 Cladonia deformis
 Cladonia macroceras
 Cladonia macrophylla
 Cladonia pocillum
 Cladonia pyxidata
 Cladonia rangiferina
 some unidentified Cladonia species

References

Dothideomycetes
Fungi described in 1900